Trigonidomimus belfragei, or Belfrage's cricket, is a species of anomalous cricket in the family Gryllidae. It is found in North America.

References

Crickets
Articles created by Qbugbot
Insects described in 1912